Los Muertos is a 2004 Argentine drama film directed by Lisandro Alonso. It follows a released prisoner (Vargas) who, convicted of murder years ago, looks for his now adult daughter. Vargas' journey is slow and contemplative though Alonso refuses to externalize his psychology, making much of the film's events open-ended and impressionistic.

The film is considered part of Alonso's "Lonely Man Trilogy," which also includes La Libertad and Liverpool.

Cast
 Argentino Vargas as Vargas

References

External links

2004 films
Argentine drama films
2000s Spanish-language films
2004 drama films
Films directed by Lisandro Alonso
2000s Argentine films